Francis C. Schroen, SJ, (1857–1924) was a Jesuit brother, who was an interior designer and painter principally of Roman Catholic institutions.

Life
Born in the Kingdom of Bavaria in 1857, he eventually immigrated to the United States. He designed a number of venues for Georgetown University, including Dahlgren Chapel of the Sacred Heart and parts of Healy Hall such as Gaston Hall, the Bioethics Library Hirst Reading Room, Carroll Parlor, and the main Parlor Corridor.

He also designed the 1900 chapel of Loyola School in New York, which featured the stained glass by Louis C. Tiffany and a white marble altar of his own design below a canopied statue of Our Lady of Lourdes by the New York-sculptor Joseph Sibbel.

Francis Schroen died in 1924 and was buried in Jesuit community cemetery on the campus of Georgetown University.

References	

1857 births
1924 deaths
19th-century American Jesuits
20th-century American Jesuits
Roman Catholic religious brothers
Catholic painters
19th-century German Jesuits
19th-century German painters
19th-century German male artists
Burials at the Jesuit Community Cemetery
20th-century German Roman Catholic priests
20th-century German painters
20th-century German male artists